James Francis Guthrie,  (13 September 1872 – 18 August 1958) was an Australian politician. Born at Rich Avon Station in Victoria, he was educated at Geelong College before becoming a grazier, sheep breeder and woolbroker. In 1919, he was elected to the Australian Senate as a Nationalist Senator for Victoria. In 1931, together with the rest of his party, he joined the United Australia Party. He held the seat until his defeat in 1937, taking effect in 1938.

Guthrie was made a Commander of the Order of the British Empire (CBE) in the 1946 New Year Honours. He died in 1958.

References

1872 births
1958 deaths
Nationalist Party of Australia members of the Parliament of Australia
United Australia Party members of the Parliament of Australia
Members of the Australian Senate for Victoria
Members of the Australian Senate
20th-century Australian politicians
Australian Commanders of the Order of the British Empire